was a popular Japanese television drama by screenwriter Kankuro Kudo.  Based on a novel by Ira Ishida, it initially aired on the Tokyo Broadcasting System during the summer of 2000, and was directed by Yukihiko Tsutsumi. The success of the television series would launch a manga adaptation the following year. In a break from traditional Japanese programming, the series used edgy graphics and scene breaks to highlight a story involving themes drawn from the underbelly of modern Japanese society: hip-hop youth gang warfare, juvenile delinquency, prostitution, drug abuse, the Yakuza, rape and murder.

Notable among the cast are Tokio lead singer Tomoya Nagase, film star Ken Watanabe, and future stars Koyuki, Satoshi Tsumabuki, and Tomohisa Yamashita of Johnny's Jimusho idol group NEWS. The series is also credited for raising the profile of actor Yōsuke Kubozuka.

Summary

Twenty-one-year-old Makoto, the former #1 waru of Ikebukuro in his high school years, hangs out at the bowling alley and in the eponymous park of the series with best friend Masa on a repetitive nightly basis. Their world starts to change as  Shun, Rika, and Hikaru enter their lives after chance meetings in the park. Soon after, Rika is found raped and murdered in a love hotel, bringing unwanted police attention and a new detective to Ikebukuro on the trail of a serial rapist. After being suspected, arrested, and detained by the police in classic Japanese style (beatings, coerced confessions), Makoto is released and vows to find justice for Rika. Enlisting the help of Takashi, an old school friend, and his gang, the G-Boys, Makoto starts his search and gains a reputation for getting problems solved in the underworld of Ikebukuro - much to the consternation of Yokoyama and the police. Things then begin to spiral out of control in Ikebukuro, as not everything is what it seems to be...

Characters
 Makoto Majima
 Main character and primary protagonist of I.W.G.P., Makoto is a 20-year-old former waru without an obvious direction in his life at the start of the series. He commonly complains that things are "mendokusai" (bothersome). He earns spending money through petty theft and by hustling people at the bowling alley where he, Masa, and later the G-Boys hang out; he wins a BMW from Yokoyama in this fashion. During the day, he helps out at his mother's fruit shop; at night, he hangs out on the streets of Ikebukuro. After Rika is found murdered, Makoto's actions earn him a reputation as the "mover and shaker of Ikebukuro" by both the police and the underworld. Running gags involving his character include: his love of yakisoba covered in mayonnaise, bowling, and his uncooperative erection during his interactions with the women of the series.

 Masa
 Makoto's best friend. Masa works at the bowling alley with Kaoru. Unlike Makoto, Masa eventually joins the G-Boys in order to retaliate against the Black Angels for their apparent murder of Shun.

 Rika Nakamura
 Makoto's girlfriend. Rika typically dressed in ganguro style. She and Hikaru first meets Makoto and crew when the girls notice Shun drawing in the park, then join them for a night on the town. After meeting Makoto, Rika breaks things off with her sugar daddy. During one of their nightly adventures, Rika and Makoto sneak off to a love hotel. Soon after, Rika is called out by the serial rapist, and later found murdered.

 Hikaru Shibusawa
 Rika's best friend. Her psychological issues underlie the dramatic action of the series, and form the critical plot that brings the series to its climax.

 Takashi Ando
 Eccentric schoolmate of Makoto and "King" of the G-Boys, an "Oriental-style Asian Gang" (per their business card) based out of a van-conversion who identify with the color yellow. Son of a senile sentō owner, he dates an older woman named "Jessie" who is fluent in Russian. While highly violent and skilled in close quarters combat, he does not allow drug use or sales within his gang. He constantly pesters Makoto to join the G-Boys, but continues to support Makoto's missions despite his rejection.

 Black Angels
 Rival gang, identified with the color black, started by the ballet-dancing Kyoichi Ozaki.

 Shun Mizuno
 A quiet artistic loner with a penchant for drawing disturbing images, he is initially approached by Makoto and Masa after they catch him shoplifting from a local bookstore. He later asks to join their group, offering Ikefukurō-zō, the symbol of Ikebukuro that he had just lifted and becomes a critical member of their ingroup. Shun dates Kaoru, the girl who works at the bowling alley, during the latter part of the series. In the buildup to the final climax of the series, Shun is murdered by Yamai and the Black Angels as part of a wider plot.

 Yamai
 Nicknamed "Doberman" for his beating of a chained dog, Yamai was a schoolmate of Makoto and serves as a constant foil to Makoto and Takashi. He is easily beaten in a showdown with Takashi, after which he attempts revenge by trying to implicate Takashi in drug dealing. Yamai later joins the Black Angels, is critical to the plot that brings the series to its climax, and is responsible for the death of Shun.

 Fujio Saitou
 Nicknamed "Saru" (monkey), Fujio is a former schoolmate of Makoto who joined the local Yakuza family because he was tired of being "weak". He was assigned to look over and protect the daughter of the Boss; his mistakes bring the Yakuza to ask for Makoto's help, but the results cost Saitou his pinky. He appears as an ally and contact for Makoto throughout the series.

 Yokoyama
 A hard-nosed, no-nonsense detective brought into Ikebukuro in response to the presence of a serial rapist and the growing presence of youth gangs in the ward. He orders the initial beating and questioning of Makoto after Rika is found dead, which ends only when locals are brought in to testify for Makoto's character.

 Ritsuko Majima
 Makoto's mother. A former snack bar hostess who raised Makoto as a single mother, she now runs a small fruit shop and tends to get involved in get-rich-quick schemes. Often lying about her age, she dresses and acts younger than her 42 years. She is the love interest of the local detective.

 Chiaki
 Sex worker and former classmate of Makoto who works at Last Chance, the "soapland" across the street from the Majima's fruit shop - which she frequents to gossip. After Makoto gains a reputation for getting things done, she asked him to help out her client/boyfriend Ali, who found himself in trouble after attacking her drug dealer in an attempt to help her clean up. Ali reveals her real name is Emi.

 Kana Matsui
 A girl hired by Ritsuko to help out around the shop, she becomes a love interest for Makoto. After leaving the shop, he discovers her working as a nursery school teacher, and later as a prostitute for the local Yakuza boss. She ends up stabbed as part of the elaborate plot that works to the climax of the series.

Main cast
 Tomoya Nagase - Makoto Majima
 Ai Kato - Hikaru Shibusawa
 Yōsuke Kubozuka - Takashi, G-Boys King
 Tomohisa Yamashita - Shun Mizuno
 Ryuta Sato - Masa
 Koyuki - Kana Matsui
 Satoshi Tsumabuki - Fujio Saitou
 Issei Takahashi - Kazunori Morinaga
 Aiko Morishita - Ritsuko Majima
 Ken Watanabe - Detective Yokoyama
 Sadao Abe - Hamaguchi
 Kazuhiro Nishijima - Kyoichi Ozaki
 Kenji Sakaguchi - Yamai (Doberman)
 Kitaro - Yoshioka
 Shin Yazawa - Chiaki
 Wakana Sakai - Rika

Episodes
See List of Ikebukuro West Gate Park episodes

Awards
Ikebukuro West Gate Park won 7 Television Drama Academy Prize (Best Drama, Ensemble Cast, Opening sequence, Supporting Actor, Theme Song, Scriptwriter, and Director) from Japanese TV listings-Magazine The Television in 2000.

See also
Ikebukuro West Gate Park (manga)
Japanese television programs

References

External links

IWGP on Jdorama.com

Japanese drama television series
2000 Japanese television series debuts
2000 Japanese television series endings
Television shows written by Kankurō Kudō
Television shows based on Japanese novels
TBS Television (Japan) dramas